Kathy Jordan and Larisa Neiland were the defending champions, but none competed this year.

Sandy Collins and Elna Reinach won the title by defeating Yayuk Basuki and Caroline Vis 5–7, 6–4, 7–6(9–7) in the final.

Seeds

Draw

Draw

References

External links
 Official results archive (ITF)
 Official results archive (WTA)

Virginia Slims of Nashville
Virginia Slims of Nashville
1991 in sports in Tennessee